Alexander Lambert (November 1, 1863 – December 31, 1929) was a pianist and a piano teacher.

Biography
He was born on November 1, 1863, in Warsaw, Poland, to Henry Lambert.

He graduated from the Vienna Conservatory of Music in 1878.

After moving to New York, he was faculty of New York College of Music. His students included Jerome Kern, Alfred Newman, Anita Socola Specht, and Fannie Morris Spencer. He also taught at the Curtis Institute of Music in Philadelphia. His book, Piano Method for Beginners, was published by G. Schirmer.

He died on New Year's Eve 1929 in Manhattan when he was struck and killed by a taxicab. He left an estate with a net value of $273,457, and was buried in Washington Cemetery in Brooklyn. The pallbearers at his funeral included Walter Damrosch, Daniel Frohman, Sergei Rachmaninoff, Artur Bodanzky, Walter W. Naumburg, Efrem Zimbalist, and Jascha Heifetz and Josef Hofmann who also played music.

References

External links

Profile, Mahler Foundation

1863 births
1929 deaths
American pianists
Polish emigrants to the United States
Emigrants from the Russian Empire to the United States
American male pianists
University of Music and Performing Arts Vienna alumni
New York College of Music faculty
Curtis Institute of Music faculty
Pedestrian road incident deaths
Road incident deaths in New York City